I Am the Night may refer to:

I Am the Night (album), 3rd studio album (1985) by American heavy metal band Pantera
"I Am the Night" (Batman: The Animated Series), episode 49 (November 9, 1992) of American TV superhero series
I Am the Night (TV series), six-episode American serial killer mystery on TNT starting January 27, 2019

See also
"I Am the Night—Color Me Black", episode 146 (March 27, 1964) of American TV anthology series The Twilight Zone